Terrill Shaw (born February 4, 1976) is a former American football wide receiver who played nine seasons in the Arena Football League with the Buffalo Destroyers, Grand Rapids Rampage, Las Vegas Gladiators, Philadelphia Soul, Dallas Desperados and Tampa Bay Storm. Shaw played college football at the University of Southern Mississippi. He was the MVP of ArenaBowl XV. He was also a member of the Kansas City Chiefs, Berlin Thunder and New Orleans Saints.

Professional career
Shaw spent the 2000 Arena Football League season with the Buffalo Destroyers. He was placed on recallable waivers by the Destroyers on April 9, 2001. Shaw was signed from the Grand Rapids Rampage's practice squad on May 25, 2001. He was the MVP of ArenaBowl XV after accumulating twelve receptions, 172 receiving yards, and five touchdowns in the Rampage's 62-42 victory over the Nashville Kats on August 19, 2001.

Shaw was signed by the Kansas City Chiefs on January 11, 2002. He was allocated to NFL Europe's Berlin Thunder in February 2002. He was released from the Thunder in April 2009 and chose to opt out of his Chiefs contract. Shaw signed with the New Orleans Saints on June 16, 2003. He was released by the Saints on August 25, 2003.

Shaw signed with the Las Vegas Gladiators on October 28, 2003. He was released by the Gladiators on May 18, 2004. Shaw signed with the Philadelphia Soul on May 20, 2004. He was signed by the Tampa Bay Storm on October 20, 2006. He was released by the Storm on October 2, 2008.

Personal life

Terrill Shaw is married to Eri Shaw and has 3 sons. His oldest attends Allen High School.

References

External links
Just Sports Stats

Living people
1976 births
American football wide receivers
American football defensive backs
African-American players of American football
Southern Miss Golden Eagles football players
Buffalo Destroyers players
Grand Rapids Rampage players
Philadelphia Soul players
Las Vegas Gladiators players
Dallas Desperados players
Tampa Bay Storm players
New Orleans Saints players
Kansas City Chiefs players
Berlin Thunder players
Players of American football from Mississippi
People from Magee, Mississippi
21st-century African-American sportspeople
20th-century African-American sportspeople